The Department of Journalism at City, University of London, is a journalism school in London.  It is regarded as one of the best universities in the United Kingdom for the study of journalism. as well as the nation's largest centre for journalism education.  It was described by Michael Hann of The Guardian, along with Cardiff School of Journalism, Media and Cultural Studies, as the "Oxbridge of journalism".

The British newspaper The Independent praised its "legendary status within the media", primarily due to its practical approach to journalism and its "unparalleled access to media facilities".

The department is situated in the university's Grade II listed College Building, which dates from 1894.

The department is ranked 1st in the UK for graduate prospects in media and communications (Sunday Times Good University Guide 2022), 1st in the UK for Communications and Media Studies (The Complete University Guide 2023) and 1st in London for overall satisfaction in Journalism (NSS 2022)

The department is ranked 1st for journalism in the Guardian Good University Guide with a score of 100.

Senior faculty 
Suzanne Franks
Jane Martinson
Mark Honisgbaum
Richard Danbury
Jane Singer
James Rogers
Glenda Cooper
Zahera Harb
Paul Lashmar

Alumni 

 Kamal Ahmed – former BBC News Economics Editor
 Samira Ahmed – freelance broadcaster and writer
 Richard Arnold – Entertainment Editor for Good Morning Britain
 Bea Ballard – chief executive of 10 Star Entertainment
 Catherine Bennett – columnist, The Observer
 Joanna Blythman – investigative journalist
 Emily Buchanan – BBC World Affairs Correspondent
 Robert Crampton – journalist on The Times
 Ellie Crisell – BBC News presenter
 Evan Davis – presenter, PM (BBC Radio 4), and former BBC Economics Editor
 Imogen Edwards-Jones – writer, author and journalist
 Alex Graham – television producer
 James Harding – former Editor of The Times
 Faisal Islam – Economics Editor BBC News
 Saeed Kamali Dehghan – journalist for The Guardian specialising in Iran
 Kirsty Lang – BBC presenter
 Will Lewis – former Editor of The Daily Telegraph
 Sharon Maguire – film director, former television producer
 James Meek – writer, former ITN journalist
 Stephen Robert Morse – journalist and documentary filmmaker
 Dermot Murnaghan – presenter, Sky News
 John Mullin – deputy head of sport at The Telegraph
 Fraser Nelson – Editor, The Spectator
 Ben Preston – Executive Editor, The Sunday Times
 Sophie Raworth – BBC News anchor and television presenter
 Boris Starling – novelist and screenwriter
 Julie Stewart Binks – anchor and sports reporter
 Laura Topham – journalist, Daily Mail
 Dimitris Varos – Greek journalist and writer
 Susan Watts – Science journalist
 Jo Whiley – television presenter and Radio 2 disc jockey
 Caroline Wyatt – BBC News journalist
 Gary Younge – British journalist, author, broadcaster and academic

References

External links 
 City, University of London — Department of Journalism

Educational institutions established in 1976
Journalism Department
Journalism schools in the United Kingdom
University departments in England
1976 establishments in England